Ernest Lewis may refer to:

 Ernest Lewis (tennis) (1867–1930), British amateur lawn tennis player
 Ernest Lewis (footballer), Welsh footballer
 Ernest W. Lewis (1875–1919), American jurist
 Ernie Lewis (1924–1995), American football fullback